Lajos Kurunczy (3 July 1896 – 22 December 1983) was a Hungarian sprinter. He competed in four events at the 1924 Summer Olympics.

References

External links
 

1896 births
1983 deaths
Athletes (track and field) at the 1924 Summer Olympics
Hungarian male sprinters
Olympic athletes of Hungary
Athletes from Budapest